YKKO (an abbreviation of Yan Kin Kyay Oh, from ) is a restaurant chain in Myanmar specializing in kyay oh. The moniker comes from Yankin Township in Yangon, where the chain's first restaurant is located. Several YKKO restaurants exist in Yangon. The chain also offers Chinese food at its restaurants.

References

External links
 YKKO website
 YouTube video of Yangon outlet

Restaurants in Myanmar
Restaurants in Yangon